Whipper is a budgerigar from Winton, Southland District, New Zealand. His unusual appearance, long curly plumage, and vocalisations, which were caused by a genetic mutation made him famous in his home country.

After being placed with, and rejected by his mother, his owner took personal care of Whipper. This early separation from his own species may have resulted in his unique vocal sounds, and later reintroduction to other budgerigars caused normal calls to be more evident.

Mutation
Whipper's vet declared him as a mutant. Bird mutations are well documented and can cause health problems.

Mutation is common within the species, caused by "budgerigar colour genetics". However, Whipper's unique mutation is long curly feathers, short flightless wings and apparent blindness. It is suspected that the mutation, which is known to budgerigar breeders as the "feather duster budgerigar" mutation, caused unrestricted feather growth, resulting in the budgerigar's dishevelled appearance.

Public notability
 U-ZOO Feature, United Kingdom (YouTube): "Really Weird-Looking Bird"
 Promotional Appearance (July 2004)"Local veterinary clinic promotion"
 Honkonui Gold Interview (audio): "Chirping alone with owner, on his favorite radio station"

See also
 Feather
 Breed
 List of individual birds

References

Individual parrots
Individual animals in New Zealand